William Nathaniel Rogers (July 21, 1893 – December 1981) was a baseball player in the Negro leagues from the 1920s to the 1940s.

A native of Spartanburg, South Carolina, Rogers played outfielder, catcher, and infielder. In 1927, he had a 31-game hitting streak for the Chicago American Giants. Rogers died in 1981 in Memphis, Tennessee at age 88.

References

External links
 and Baseball-Reference Black Baseball stats and Seamheads
 Nat Rogers at Negro Leagues Baseball Museum

1893 births
1981 deaths
Date of death missing
Birmingham Black Barons players
Brooklyn Royal Giants players
Chicago American Giants players
Columbia Giants players
Harrisburg Giants players
Kansas City Monarchs players
Memphis Red Sox players
Baseball outfielders
20th-century African-American sportspeople